This article describes the conjugation and use of verbs in Slovene. Further information about the grammar of the Slovene language can be found in the article Slovene grammar.

This article follows the tonal orthography. For the conversion into pitch orthography, see Slovene national phonetic transcription.

Grammatical categories

Persons and numbers 
Slovene has three numbers (singular, dual, plural), for more information see Slovene declension.

Slovene also has three persons:

 First person, used to refer to the speaker or a group the speaker is a part of.
 Second person, used to refer to the listener or for a general subject (the same as what one is used in English or man in German).
 Third person, used to refer to a person that does participate in a conversation, when there is no subject (with impersonal verbs) and when the subject is not in nominative case (e. g.  'I am not home', but literally 'I is not home').

First and third person can be used instead of second when talking to children. Second person can be used instead of the first when one is talking to oneself and want to sound detached.

Tenses 
In Slovene, there are four tenses:

 The present tense.
 The past or preterite tense.
 The pluperfect (past perfect) tense.
 The future tense.

Moods 
There are 4 verb moods:

 Indicative mood, which is used to state a fact or opinion. It can be in all aforementioned tenses.
 Imperative mood, which is used to give commands. It can only be in present tense.
 Conditional mood , which is used to state possibilities or wishes, for example, If only I were... It can be in present or preterite tense.
 Optative or hortative mood, which is used to give commands, for assumptions and for encouragement. It can be in all tenses. Both names are usually used interchangeably, but since there are two ways of formation, terms in this article refer to different ways of formation, especially because only one of them can be used for encouragement (and can hence be called hortative). In Slovene literature, this mood is only considered to be extension of the indicative and conditional mood.

Non-finite forms 
In addition, there are several non-finite forms:

 Long infinitive in / and short infinitive in /, the use of the latter one is limited to non-formal situations and mostly to speech.
 Supine in /.
 Gerund, indicating an act or a thing being acted upon.

Aspect 
As in all Slavic languages, Slovene verbs are classified based on their aspect:

 Perfective verbs, which represent a completed action.
 Imperfective verbs, which represent an ongoing action.

Each verb is either perfective or imperfective, and most verbs occur in pairs to express the same meaning with different aspects. While each aspect is represented by a full verb with its own distinct conjugation, certain combinations are not or rarely used in one aspect or the other. For example, imperfective verbs generally lack a past passive participle, while perfective verbs usually have no present participles. Additionally, the present tense has 2 different meanings depending on the aspect of a verb. For imperfective verbs, it has present meaning, while for perfective verbs, it has a future meaning expressing a desire to carry out the action. For example, . "I want to sell the cow" (compare this with the future tense . "I will sell the cow").

Transitivity 
As well, verbs can be classified based on their transitivity. Many verbs in Slovene can be both transitive and intransitive depending on their use in a sentence. However, all reflexive verbs, which are marked by the participle  (one self), are intransitive.

Impersonal verbs 
There are also impersonal verbs; these can only have forms for third person and participles in neuter gender. These are mostly verbs to describe weather, such as  'to rain' and  'to thunder'.

Voices 
There are three voices: active, passive, and reflexive. Active and reflexive voice can be in all tenses, while passive voice cannot be in pluperfect or past (and future) conditional.

Verb classes 
Verbs are often classified into six classes, depending on their verbal suffix in infinitive:

 Class I has no verbal suffix, e. g.  'carry' and  'drink'.
 Class II has suffix , e. g.  'sink, sag'.
'sit' and  'scream'.
 Class IV has suffix , e. g.  'aim'.
'weave' and  'write'.
'buy'

Accentual types 
There are several different accentual types, that can be divided differently. It is rarely divided the same way as in Proto-Slavic because all the accent shifts have made such division impractical. It is usually divided where the accent is situated and thus the verbs are divided into seven groups.

 Accent is not directly before the endings (marked as I)
 Accent is directly before infinitive ending and not directly before present indicative endings (marked as II A)
 Accent can be on two different vowels in infinitive (marked as II B)
 Accent is on other vowel in infinitive and present indicative (marked as II C)
 Accent is on the last vowel (marked as II D); currently, only verb  and its derivatives follows this pattern. In the past, verbs  and  also followed this pattern.
 Accent is directly before the endings (marked as III)
 Accent is not directly before infinitive ending and directly before present indicative endings (marked as IV)

Polite forms 
Slovene has T–V distinction and has many different polite forms. See T–V distinction in the world's languages § Slovene for when they are used.

 Forms showed here are  forms.
  is formed by replacing second person singular with plural, participles are in masculine forms.
  is formed by replacing second person singular with plural, but participles stay in singular.
  is formed by replacing second person and third person singular with third person plural, participles are in masculine forms.
  is formed by replacing second person with third person, participles are in neuter forms.

Morphological structure 
Verbs in Slovene have a complex morphological structure as they consist of several phonemes. The core of a verb form prefixes, roots and root suffixes. Root is the only of these three morphemes that is not optional and other morphemes are added to it. In most cases only one is present in a verb, but there are also verbs with more than one root, e. g.  'to bourgeoisize'. Prefixes often indicate a perfective verb. Most verbs have none or one prefix, but some can also have more, such as  'split evenly'. Root suffixes are not so common; an example would be  'cut wood' or  'to bourgeoisize'. These parts together convey the meaning of a verb.

The stem is formed by adding a verbal suffix, which influences the aspect ( vs.  'break'; the first one is perfective, the other one imperfective) and the conjugation. Verbs have two stems. The present stem forms the base for all forms of the present indicative and the imperative, as well as the present participles. The infinitive stem forms the infinitives, supine, gerund, and past participles.

The suffix is then followed by the ending, which is specific for each person/number/case. There are also free morphemes, such as  'pretend',  'make mistakes' or  'love'.

Conjugation 
Only the present indicative, the imperative and the non-finite forms are usually formed synthetically, by changing the form of the verb directly. All other forms are periphrastic (analytic), and are formed using auxiliary verbs or other additional words.

Verbs are separated based on the ending vowel of their stem.

Present indicative 
In present indicative, verbs have mostly the same endings across all declensions, but those following accentual type II D, III, IV, and some following II A can also have a special stylistically marked ending in third person plural. Those that have ending  have the infix  in second person plural and second / third person dual. The extra  is added to the endings when the verb stem ends in a consonant.

The special ending in third person plural are always acute, but otherwise do not change the accent, except for the lengthening of short vowels. Verbs following II B, II C and III can be either acute or allow both accents in infinitive, but that does not affect the further accent changes. Verbs following II D, when accented on the same vowel on the stem as in infinitive also have the same accent. Dialectally, verbs in  can also omit the  infix, and it is common for speakers of Littoral dialect group to add the infix elsewhere, as well as to use the ending .

Forms in brackets are not officially recognized to be correct in standard Slovene. All verbs in  can archaically have short accent on the last syllable in dual and plural, as well as verb .

Imperative mood 
The imperative mood is used to give commands, and only exists in the present tense. There are no forms for the third person plural, and use for first and third person singular and third person dual is stylistically marked.

Present stems ending with other vowels drop their final vowel.

Verbs change accent in imperative based on the accent in infinitive and indicative, as well as where in the word the accent is:

 Accentual type II A, circumflex indicative: singular is acute if the accent is not on the last syllable, otherwise it allows both accents, except final open-mid , which is circumflex. In dual and plural, accent is circumflex if the accent is on the penultimate syllable, otherwise it is acute.
 Accentual type II C and III, circumflex indicative: accent is circumflex if on the last syllable in singular and on the penultimate syllable in dual and plural, otherwise it is acute.
 Accentual type II and III, cute indicative: singular is acute, but allows both accents on the last syllable. In dual and plural, accent is circumflex if the accent is on the penultimate syllable, otherwise it is acute.
 Accentual type III, short accent in indicative: accent is acute, except on the penultimate syllable in dual and plural.
 Accentual type IV: accent is acute except on the last syllable in singular and penultimate syllable in dual and plural, where it is circumflex.
 Some acute verbs following accentual type I can in imperative follow II B (example). The accent therefore changes the same way as with those.
 Acute verbs following accentual type III that are circumflex in passive participle and the accent is on the same syllable in indicative can be acute or circumflex (example ).
 Verbs ,  and  change the accent irregularly.
 All verbs that change the accentuated vowel, except accentual type III, are in many dialects always accentuated on the first vowel throughout.

Examples:

 . (Tidy your room.)
 . (Let's play. Literally, Let's go playing)
 . (I should be working and toiling while you spend the money. – Such use is stylistically marked.)
 . ([Let] it be your way. – Such use is stylistically marked.)

Present active participles 
There are two present active participles, which are used almost exclusively with imperfective verbs.

The first is an adjectival participle. It declines as a regular soft adjective with fixed accent and is compared periphrastically.

The accent is the same for all accentual types, however it is differentiated between different endings.

The accent is acute, except in masculine singular nominative form, where it allows both accents.

Examples:

 . (A child that cries is a crying child.)
 . (He entered the room singing loudly.)
  (The question painfully hurt his feelings.)

The second is an adverbial participle. It was originally the nominative singular of the first participle, which had an irregular form. Verbs with present stem in  usually also take the infinitive verbal suffix, but archaic form is made with present suffix. Again, the accent depends fully on the type of ending and not on the accentual type. If the accent is on the last syllable, then it allows both accents, otherwise it is circumflex.

Example:

 . ([While] sitting, he stretched.)

Infinitives and supine 

There are 2 verbal nouns: the infinitive, which can be long or short and the supine.

The supine and short infinitive are formed by dropping the last  of the infinitive. Supine is used after verbs that designate motion. For example, the supine would be used in the following sentences (the supine has been put in bold):

 . (They went to the New World to seek fortune.)
 . (Literally, Go salt yourself. This idiomatic statement is used to express annoyance or refusal)
 . (We ran to put out the fire.)

When the infinitive or supine ending is attached to an infinitive stem ending in a consonant, that consonant may change, as follows:
  →  ("beat")
  →  ("scratch, scrape")
  →  ("sit down")
  →  ("find (something lost)")
  →  ("braid")
  →  ("grow")
  →  ("bite, chew")
  →  (() "lie down")
  →  (() "say")

However, there is an accentual difference between short infinitive and supine. In addition, accent in supine is in some accentual types different between perfective and imperfective verbs. Short infinitive has the same accent as supine of perfective verbs, except for two irregular verbs detailed below. The accent is determined by the accentual type, as well as stem vowel and the position in a word:

 Supine is circumflex if the last syllable is accentuated, otherwise it is acute, except verbs that are circumflex in the infinitive – these are always circumflex.
 Verbs following accentual type I, II B, II D and IV have acute accent on the stem on same syllable as long infinitive.
 Other accentual types can have short accent on the last syllable, long accent on the last syllable or long accent on non-final syllable.
The examples given below are added just to illustrate those changes and not to have separate accent changes.

The second subpattern transfers the accent to the syllable before and only exists in accentual types II C and III. Verbs in   following accentual type III can also have either long close-mid or short open-mid vowel in short infinitive.

Past active participles 
There are two kinds of past active participle, used with different functions.

The l-participle exists for all verbs, and is used mainly to form the past and future tense. It is further split into two categories; the descriptive l-participle is used only for analytical forms and therefore can only exist in nominative case and always has to appear with an auxiliary verb. The stative l-participle denotes a state of an object and can also be used as a stand-alone adjective, but not all verbs have it.

It is formed by adding  to the infinitive stem. A fill vowel (schwa) is inserted in the masculine singular form when attached to verbs with an infinitive stem ending in a consonant.

Stative l-participle can be the same as the descriptive l-participle ( → /), but it sometimes changes to have a fill vowel ( → ). The accent can also change between the two.

In feminine and neuter forms, short accent lengthens if short, and shifts in accentual types II B and II C.

Verbs following accentual type II D have short accent on the last syllable.

Tone is determined by the tone in long infinitive and present indicative, as well as accent length and position in masculine form and accentual type. Based on the accent in masculine form, verbs can belong to one of three groups:

 Long accent on the last syllable
 Short accent on the last syllable
 Long accent that is not on the last syllable

Similarly to imperative, the accent of some verbs following accentual type I can also shift to the next syllable. In these forms, accentual changes are the same as for verbs following accentual type II C.

It further declines as a regular fixed or mobile accent adjective and is compared periphrastically. Other forms have the same accent as neuter gender.

Types where accent shifts between forms, however, can vary widely between dialects. Verbs following accentual type II A colloquially prefer to have fixed accent. Verbs in  can also have fixed accent on the first syllable.

Stative participles decline as regular hard adjectives with fixed accent and are compared periphrastically.
Examples:
 . (I saw.)
 . (Upon [hearing] the news, she became pale.)

The š-participle is also an adjectival participle, and is rarely used in modern Slovene and mostly as an adverb. It denotes completed action, and is equivalent to the English construct with having + past participle. It is formed by adding  to the infinitive stem. The ending is only  if the infinitive stem ends in a consonant. Accent is almost always circumflex and on the penultimate syllable, some can also have the same accent as l-participle (example ).  before  is always close-mid, but  and  before  are the same as in l-participle.

Examples:
 . (Having stepped out of the house, he headed to the pub.)
  (Having come guest sat down by the table.)

Past passive participle 
This participle corresponds to the English participle in -ed or -en, and is an adjective that indicates a state of having undergone an action. It exists only for transitive verbs, and almost only if they are perfective. Similarly to l-participle, it is also divided into descriptive and stative passive participle.

If it is not marked, then it is on the same syllable on the stem as in long infinitive.

Participle further declines as a regular fixed accent adjective and is compared periphrastically.

,  "gush, shout").

The t-participle is always circumflex, while n-participle is circumflex or acute, depending on the accentual type, and accent in infinitive and present indicative:

Examples of this participle are:
 . (The parked car was stolen.) (perhaps better in the active voice, "Parkiran avto so ukradli.")
 . (The court tried the accused robber.)
 . (A rested horse was waiting on the yard.)

Gerund 
Gerund is formed by adding an ending  to the past passive participle. Some can also be archaically accented on the last syllable with a short accent.

Gerund is also split into two categories, but most verbs can have both (i. e. is not one or the other as is the case with participles). There is the true gerund, which means an act of doing something, and objectified gerund, which means a thing being acted upon. Not all verbs also have objectified gerund.

Gerund declines as a regular soft o-stem nouns following first neuter declension, but some can be singularia tantum.

Negative forms 
Three verbs, and  have special negative forms in present indicative:

Future indicative 
Only verbs  and  have special future indicative forms. For , this is the only correct way (but is colloquially also conjugated as other verbs), while  can also be conjugated as other verbs.

Conditional 
Verb  also has a special form when used as an auxiliary verb in conditional mood and is the same for all genders and persons: . Full lexical verb therefore still has an analytical form .

Aorist and imperfect 
Standard Slovene lost both aorist and imperfect, which have been replaced by the preterite. These forms exist exclusively in the Resian dialect, but are slowly fading as well.

Only a few verbs also have aorist, and all of this forms are considered obsolete as they cannot be understood by most people anymore. There are only three such documented forms:

  (SS from ) "(I) have gone"
  (SS from ) "(I) have come"
  (SS from ) "(you) have taken / (he/she/it) has taken"
Aorist and imperfect have been in use in other dialects until the 15th century and vowel clusters in imperfect have already been contracted then.

Analytical forms 
Forms given here are in the way they appear in a typical sentence. However, in the dictionary form, lexical verb is first and then everything else, except in negative forms (e. g.  → )

Active voice

Past indicative 
The past (or preterite) indicative is used to indicate events that occurred in the past. Modern Slovene does not distinguish the past tense ("saw") from the perfect tense ("have seen"); this distinction was common in Alpine Slovene when aorist served the past tense form.

It is formed with the auxiliary verb  (to be) in the present tense, plus the l-participle of the verb. The participle must agree with the subject in number and gender. For example:

  (I saw, said by a male)
  (I saw, said by a female)
  (she went)
  (they discovered)

Pluperfect indicative 
The pluperfect indicative is used to indicate an action that occurred before some other future action. It is rarely used in colloquial speech, where it is replaced by the past tense.

It is formed as though it were the past tense of the past tense: the auxiliary verb  (to be) in the present tense, plus the l-participle of the verb  (to be), plus the l-participle of the verb. The participles must agree with the subject in number and gender. For example:

  (I had seen, said by a male)
  (I had seen, said by a female)
  (she had gone)
  (they had discovered)

Future indicative 
The future indicative tense is used to state events that will happen in the future.

The verb  (to be) has its own unique set of future tense forms, with the stem . Other verbs are usually formed using  in the future tense, plus the l-participle of the verb. The participle must agree with the subject in number and gender. For example:

  (I will see, said by a male)
  (I will see, said by a female)
  (she will go)
  (they will discover)
Dialectally,  is used in future indicative as an auxiliary verb, followed by infinitive.

Conditional mood 
The conditional mood is used to express desires, wishes, and hypothetical (often impossible) conditions.

The present conditional is formed using the special particle , plus the l-participle of the lexical verb. The past conditional is rarely used, like the pluperfect, and is formed analogously: the particle , plus l-participle of the verb  (to be), plus the l-participle of the verb. Examples of the conditional mood are:

 . (Literally: If it became sick to me, to me, I kindly ask, pass those pills.; If I should become sick, kindly pass me those pills.)
 . (Should there be a fire, we would die.)
 . (If we had finished earlier, we would be free now.)
 . (He wishes that he were a model, but with his facial impurities, he has no chance.)
  (O, if only it were autumn!) (literary)
  (O, if only it were autumn!)
In the 18th century, future conditional was also rarely used, which was formed by bom bil + l-participle, e. g.  (If I asked [in the future]). Such use has only been recorded to be in active voice.

Optative 
An additional kind of imperative, which may be called the optative or hortative, is formed by using the particle  with the indicative or conditional. This acts as a substitute for the imperative in the third person and other tenses as well. It is usually not translated as 'may', because nowadays use is closer to the imperative, so a more appropriate word would be 'should'. However, this kind of form has many uses, so it may also sometimes be translated as 'let' or with passive voice.

 . (He should come to help me.)
  (Let it be your way.)
  (Let me tell you, how it happened.)
  (But let him be so tired, he reached the finish [line]).
 . (This process is thought to be caused by fungi.)

Negative forms 
It is formed by simply adding  in front of the verb, only  is before. In dictionary forms, the lexical verbs is in last place, except where it combines with the auxiliary verb:

  (Noone asked us.)(lit. Noone has not asked us.)
  (I would not like to meet him.)
 . (It is better not to work than to do (lit. work) harm.)
 . (I have not worked any less than others.)

Passive & reflexive voice 
The passive voice is formed using the passive past participle of the verb and auxiliary verbs. Reflexive voice is formed by turning a verb into a reflexive verb, by adding the reflexive pronoun  to the verb. Passive and reflexive voice is formed as shown in this table:

An example of the passive voice is:

  (He was elected a fellow of the Royal Society).

However, this is more commonly stated using the active voice with an impersonal form of the third person plural (like English "impersonal they"):

  (They elected him a fellow of the Royal Society).

Full conjugation of a regular verb 
The following table presents full conjugation of a regular verb dẹ́lati:

References

General

Dialectal and obsolete conjugation

Examples

External links 

Slovene grammar
Indo-European verbs